Schönenberg is a municipality in the district of Lörrach in Baden-Württemberg in Germany. The convent within the village is a popular pilgrimage site for Roman Catholics.

References

Lörrach (district)
Baden
Catholic pilgrimage sites